Druid Park (originally known as the Wheatsheaf Ground) is a multi-purpose stadium in Woolsington, north Newcastle upon Tyne in England.  It is currently used mostly for rugby union matches and was the home stadium of Gosforth RFC from 2007–2014. Druid Park is the home of Fawdon FC (formally of The Northeast Combination League Premier Division and they are playing in the Northern Football Alliance League Division 3 for the 2021/22 season.

The ground 
Druid Park used to be the ground of the Newcastle Blue Star football club. It currently uses artificial turf. 

For the 2007/08 season, Gosforth RFC moved to a new ground, Druid Park, from their former location Bullocksteads Sports Ground. Dave Thompson, the major shareholder of Newcastle Falcons, invited Gosforth to be the main player at Druid Park. Thompson took a 25-year lease on the ground.

Druid park is close to Newcastle Airport.

.

References 

Rugby union stadiums in England
Sports venues in Newcastle upon Tyne
Newcastle Falcons
American football venues in the United Kingdom